Family Practice is a peer-reviewed medical journal published by Oxford University Press dealing with matters of interest to general practitioners. It includes a section entitled the WONCA news, published for the World Organization of National Colleges, Academies, and Academic Associations of General Practitioners/Family Physicians.

Abstracting and indexing
The journal is abstracted and indexed in CAB Abstracts, Current Contents/Clinical Medicine, Embase, PubMed, and the Science Citation Index Expanded. According to the Journal Citation Reports, the journal has a 2020 impact factor of 2.267.

References

External links
 

English-language journals
Publications established in 1984
Family medicine journals
Oxford University Press academic journals
Bimonthly journals